Nemacheilus tuberigum is a species of stone loach endemic to Sumatra, Indonesia. It grows to  SL.

References

T
Endemic fauna of Sumatra
Freshwater fish of Sumatra
Fish described in 2001